Popout, Inc. DBA Shippo, is an American software company that helps e-commerce businesses, online marketplaces, and platforms integrate shipping with multiple carriers through their API and web application. Shippo allows users to compare shipping rates, create labels, generate international customs documents, return labels, and track parcels. Some of their customers and partners include eBay, Freestyle Solutions, Tuft & Needle, Weebly, GoDaddy, Shyp, Mercari, Stripe, Sellbrite and Webflow. As of October 2017, Shippo has raised over $29 million in funding lead by Bessemer Venture Partners, Union Square Ventures, and SoftTechVC.

Business 
Shippo was founded in 2013 and is headquartered in San Francisco, California. With 100,000 businesses reportedly using their system, Shippo sends millions of packages to and from 196 countries around the world.

Shippo provides an API, web interface, as well as direct integrations with e-commerce platforms such as eBay, Amazon, Shopify, Etsy, Magento, Bigcommerce, Weebly, GoDaddy, and Stripe. Shippo aggregates all of its customers’ packages through their own account with carriers to get discounted rates, which they then pass onto customers. They help businesses generate shipping labels, as well as support for address validation, multi-carrier support, API tracking, batch label creation, discounts and international shipping. Shippo also partners with supply chain management systems such as Sellbrite, Selro, and SnapFulfil, as well as payment systems like Stripe.

Shippo is one of eBay's Guaranteed Delivery Program shipping partner platforms.

History 
Shippo started as an API then built their own app and dashboard for platforms such as Shopify and Magento to gain traction, with their core focus continuing to be the API. Their vision is to provide small online businesses the same discounts that larger retailers would get with major carriers, such as UPS, FedEx, and DHL. In March 2016, Shippo became a United States Postal Service ePostage partner alongside Amazon and Etsy, making them the first to launch ePostage for public access and one of the only publicly available USPS API connectors. Shippo is often highlighted as part of studies in logistics and delivery methods.

Laura Behrens Wu is the CEO and co-founder of Shippo. She and co-founder, Simon Kreuz, are both part of Forbes' 30 Under 30 2017 Enterprise Technology list. Wu was featured in the 2016 LinkedIn Next Wave: Top Professionals 35 & Under list.

Shippo participated in Plug and Play's StartupCamp in January 2014 and was a part of 500 Startups Batch 8. In 2014, they raised $2 million in seed funding led by SoftTechVC. Jeff Clavier, Managing Partner of SoftTechVC, also sat on Shippo's board of directors. In September 2016, Shippo announced a Series A round of $7 million led by Union Square Ventures with Albert Wenger joining their board, as Jeff Clavier steps off. In October 2017, Shippo announced that it had raised an additional $20 million in a round of Series B funding led by Bessemer Venture Partners.

By December 2017, the company had a total of funding of $30 million.

In 2018, Shippo launched a feature for retailers that allows them to track packages as they travel to customers. In October 2019, Shippo and UPS announced a plans for an app for small and mid-sized retailers.

References

External links 
 www.goshippo.com

American companies established in 2013